The Lucknow–Gorakhpur line is a railway route in Uttar Pradesh. The line is doubled broad gauge and electrified, and it is the first fully electrified railway line of the North Eastern Railway zone.

This line is one of the busiest in eastern and central Uttar Pradesh. It connects Assam, West Bengal, North Bihar and eastern Uttar Pradesh to Delhi, Haryana, Punjab, Jammu and Kashmir and Uttarakhand. Trains for Mumbai, Rajasthan and Gujarat are also connected to this line.

Major stations on this line include Barabanki, Gonda and Basti.

History
This line was constructed by the Bengal and North Western Railway during the 19th century and 20th century. It was opened in seven phases during the construction period.
 The first phase, between Barabanki and Burhwal Junction was opened on the 1st of April 1872. 
 The second phase, between Burhwal Junction and Bahramghat was opened on the 24th of November 1896.
 The third phase, between Bahramghat and Jarwal Road was opened on the 18th of December 1896.
 The fourth phase, between Jarwal Road and Colonelganj was opened on the 1st of February 1892.
 The fifth phase, between Colonelganj and Gonda was opened on the 29th of October 1981.
 The sixth phase, between Gonda and Mankapur was opened on the 2nd of April 1884.
 The seventh phase, from Mankapur to Gorakhpur Junction was opened on the 15th of January 1885.

The branch line from Burhwal Junction to Shahjahanpur was opened on the 13th of March 1911.

On 1 January 1943, this line was transferred from the initial jurisdiction to Oudh Tirhut Railway, after the amalgamation of: Bengal and North Western Railway, the Tirhut Railway, Mashrak-Thawe Extension Railway, Rohilkund and Kumaon Railway Company.

After that, on 14 April 1952, this line was transferred to the jurisdiction of North Eastern Railway, after the amalgamation of Oudh Tirhut Railway and Assam Railway Company.

Main line and branches

Projects

There is a plan to double the branch line of Burhwal Junction to Shahjahanpur Junction with electrification. This was approved in 2016 and with a tenure of five years.
90km (56 mi) of new line will be constructed between Basti (Uttar Pradesh) to Kapilvastu (NEPAL). One more proposed platform will be constructed in the Basti district.

References

5 ft 6 in gauge railways in India
Railway lines in Uttar Pradesh
Railway lines opened in 1885